Fan Zhengwei (born 1980) is a Chinese journalist and the current party secretary and president of Global Times, a tabloid under the auspices of the Chinese Communist Party's official People's Daily newspaper, since December 2021.

Biography
Fan was born in Suide County, Shaanxi, in 1980. He attended Peking University, graduating with a bachelor's degree in literature and master's degree in law. In December 2021, he was appointed party secretary and president of Global Times, succeeding Hu Xijin.

References

1980 births
Living people
People from Suide County
Peking University alumni
People's Republic of China journalists
Propaganda in China